Draperstown Celtic is a football club from the village of Draperstown, Northern Ireland. The club, founded in 1968, plays its home matches at Cahore Playing Fields. 

Draperstown Celtic were awarded the IFA Grassroots Club Of The Year Award for 2020 as well as the Inclusivity Award

Club colours
Home Kit - Green and white hoops.
Away Kit - Black with green and gold vertical stripes.
DC Diamonds - Black with pink and white vertical stripes.

The current principle club sponsor is Ballinascreen Credit Union with Capital Dynamics and Crockandun Windfarm Ltd also appearing on the kits

The clubs mental health partner is S.T.E.P.S 

As of 2020 / 21 season Draperstown Celtic have both male and female teams at various ages from U6 right up to Seniors.

Honours

Junior honours
 North West Junior Division 2 : Champions 2014/2015 
 North West Junior Division 1 : Champions 2015/2016

Intermediate honours
Northern Ireland Intermediate League: 1
2007/08
NI Intermediate League Cup :  2 (Runners-up:  1)
2004 2010 (2000)
North West Division 1:  4  (Runners Up:  3)
1973; 1988; 1992; 1995 (1983; 1987; 1990)
North West Junior Cup: 1
1990
Tobermore Cup: 1
1971
South Derry League: 1
1979
South Derry Challenge Cup: 1
1979
South Derry League Cup: 1
1979
Top Four Cup: 1
1979
North West Supplementary Cup: 1
1992
McGrogan Cup: 1  (Runners Up:  1)
2007 (2002)
Eamon Kelly Memorial Cup : 1
2001

Current squad
As of Sun 25 January 2009

References

External links 
Draperstown Celtic Football Club
NI Intermediate League Table
NW Division 1 League Table

Association football clubs in Northern Ireland
Association football clubs established in 1968
Association football clubs in County Londonderry
1968 establishments in Northern Ireland